Events in the year 2004 in Monaco.

Incumbents 
 Monarch: Rainier III
 State Minister: Patrick Leclercq

Events 

 May
 Pierre Frolla broke the world record for freediving with his 123-meter plunge into the sea at Monaco.
 AS Monaco FC was a UEFA Champions League finalist after defeating Rennes 4–1. However, they lost the championship to FC Porto.

Deaths

See also 

 2004 in Europe
 City states

References 

 
Years of the 21st century in Monaco
2000s in Monaco
Monaco
Monaco